The 1999 RTHK Top 10 Gold Songs Awards was held in 1999 for the 1998 music season.

Top 10 song awards
The top 10 songs (十大中文金曲) was expanded to top 13.

Other awards
The top 10 outstanding artist was also extended to 11 artists.

References
 RTHK top 10 gold song awards 1999

RTHK Top 10 Gold Songs Awards
Rthk Top 10 Gold Songs Awards, 1999
Rthk Top 10 Gold Songs Awards, 1999